The FIS Nordic World Ski Championships 2015 took place between 18 February and 1 March 2015 in Falun, Sweden. This was the fourth time the event is held there, having previously been held there in 1954, 1974 and 1993. In 1980, one World Ski Championship race was held there as well, to make up for its exclusion from the Olympic Games the same year.

Host selection
At the International Ski Federation (FIS) Council meeting in November 2007, a Candidates project concept was highlighted for use. Candidacy submission was 1 May 2009 along with the registration fee and training days in article 5 of the FIS World Championships Organization Rules. Each candidate and its National Ski Association will have instructions and a detailed questionnaire provided by the FIS that will be due on 1 September 2009. Candidates respond in a simple text format that will serve as the working document where an FIS Inspection Group will use for discussion purposes. Group members will meet with the candidate at mutually convenient opportunity to review the project area that falls under their responsibility. This should take place in conjunction with another event or World Cup inspection where possible to reduce costs and multiple trips. FIS Technical Committee members will have a working meeting in the fall of 2009 with each candidate and inspection group to review the project. A final report will be submitted in spring 2009 by the Inspection Group and the National Ski Association and FIS Council.

Finalists
The four finalists who submitted were those who lost out on the previous championships in 2008.

Voting results
The winner was selected at the FIS Congress in Antalya, Turkey, on 3 June 2010.

Schedule
All times are local (UTC+1).

Cross-country

Nordic combined

Ski jumping

Medal summary

Medal table

Cross-country skiing

Men

Women

Nordic combined

Ski jumping

Men

Women

Mixed

References

External links

Official website
FIS Cross-Country Site
FIS Ski Jumping Site
FIS Nordic Combined Site

 
FIS Nordic World Ski Championships
2015 in cross-country skiing
2015 in ski jumping
2015 in Nordic combined
2015 in Swedish sport
International sports competitions hosted by Sweden
February 2015 sports events in Europe
March 2015 sports events in Europe
Nordic skiing competitions in Sweden
Sports competitions in Falun